The Panjpai (Dari: literally "five feet") are a Durrani Pashtun tribal confederation found primarily in southern Afghanistan.  

The confederation's five tribes are generally given as the Alizai, Ishakzai, Nurzai. 

1